
Gmina Golub-Dobrzyń is a rural gmina (administrative district) in Golub-Dobrzyń County, Kuyavian-Pomeranian Voivodeship, in north-central Poland. Its seat is the town of Golub-Dobrzyń, although the town is not part of the territory of the gmina.

Villages
Gmina Golub-Dobrzyń contains the villages and settlements of Białkowo, Cieszyny, Duża Kujawa, Gajewo, Gałczewko, Karczewo, Lisewo, Macikowo, Nowa Wieś, Nowogród, Olszówka, Ostrowite, Paliwodzizna, Pląchoty, Podzamek Golubski, Pusta Dąbrówka, Skępsk, Sokoligóra, Sokołowo, Węgiersk and Wrocki.

Neighbouring gminas
Gmina Golub-Dobrzyń is bordered by the town of Golub-Dobrzyń and by the gminas of Bobrowo, Ciechocin, Dębowa Łąka, Kowalewo Pomorskie, Radomin, Wąpielsk and Zbójno.

References
Polish official population figures 2006

Golub-Dobrzyn
Gmina Golub Dobrzyn